George Oscar "Bud" Landress was born in Gwinnett County in 1882. He considered himself a native to Gordon County, Georgia, however. He and his friend, Bill Chitwood (of Resaca, Georgia) formed the pre-country string band The Georgia Yellow Hammers. Both played fiddle and banjo, and switched out most of the time.

Discography 

With The Georgia Yellow Hammers

"Picture on the Wall"
"My Carolina Girl"

With Turkey Mountain Singers

"I am Bound for the Promised Land"
"Precious Memories"

References

Other links 
The Georgia Yellow Hammers "G-Rag"

1882 births
Year of death missing
American banjoists
American fiddlers
Musicians from Georgia (U.S. state)
People from Gordon County, Georgia
People from Gwinnett County, Georgia